"I Love I Hate" is a song by English singer and musician Neil Arthur, released in 1994 as the lead single from his debut solo studio album Suitcase (1994). It was written by Arthur and produced by Marius de Vries. It reached No. 50 in the UK and remained on the charts for two weeks.

For the single's 12" format releases, remixes were created by the English electronic dance group the Grid, with others by Dom T. and Marius de Vries. A music video was filmed in Coney Island and New York City to promote the single. It was directed by Lindy Heymann.

Critical reception
Upon release, Music & Media wrote: "The ex-frontman of Blancmange returns at almost the same point where he left seven years ago. His synth-flavoured new wave of the early '80s is spiced up with dance beats." Alan Jones of Music Week stated: "This is pleasant commercial fare from Arthur, albeit not as startlingly innovative as some of his work with Blancmange or the West India Company." He felt the song was a "likely Top 40 contender", which "should find favour with radio in its regular mix, while The Grid's deeper dance interpretations tie up the club end of things".

Jim Lawn of The Lennox Herald commented: "Ex-Blancmange singer delivers a reasonable single with a nice hook and some radical dance remixes by The Grid." Penny Kiley of the Liverpool Echo commented: "The ex-Blancmange singer comes up with a pleasant electro-pop song that is less quirky than his previous work." She felt the inclusion of "Living on the Ceiling" as a bonus track on the CD issues of the single "suggests Neil may not be so confident in his new stuff".

In an article on 1980s New Wave band comebacks, Keith Creighton of Popdose described the song as "positively epic". Barry Page of The Electricity Club, in a feature titled "30 Lost Songs of the CD Era", considered the song to be "rather pedestrian" in comparison with Arthur's "engaging" debut single "One Day, One Time".

Formats

Personnel
 Neil Arthur – vocals
 Sylvia Mason-James, Mary Cassidy – backing vocals
 Mark Bandola – guitar

Production
 Marius de Vries – producer of "I Love I Hate"
 John Mallinson, Ben Jones – engineers on "I Love I Hate"
 James Thompson – assistant engineer on "I Love I Hate"
 Phil Bodger – mix engineer on "I Love I Hate"
 Neil Arthur – producer of "Festival", "Wendy You're a Bore" and "Oh No Not Yet"

Charts

References

External links

1994 songs
1994 singles
Chrysalis Records singles
Songs written by Neil Arthur
Song recordings produced by Marius de Vries